Rosa Whitaker Duncan-Williams, President & CEO of The Whitaker Group (TWG), is a former US government policy leader, career diplomat, and trade negotiator with a proven record of fostering investments into Africa. She served as the first Assistant US Trade Representative for Africa in the administrations of Presidents Bill Clinton and George W. Bush.

Career 

While serving as a Senior Trade Advisor to US Congressman Charlie Rangel (Former Chairman of the powerful House Ways & Means Committee), Rosa was one of the key architects that crafted the historic African Growth and Opportunity Act (AGOA), which was enacted in 2000. AGOA, America’s first comprehensive trade law towards Africa, now spanning the administrations of four US Presidents,  remains the cornerstone of US economic policy towards Africa.  It has delivered, inter-alia, billions of dollars in duty free products from Africa into the US market annually while also generating jobs and investments across the Continent.

Whitaker also co-founded and co-chaired the bipartisan advocacy group, AGOA Action Coalition, with the late Hon. Jack Kemp.

The Whitaker Group 
Whitaker launched The Whitaker Group after leaving USTR in 2003.  The Whitaker Group, based in Northern Va. and Accra, Ghana, advises clients on transactions and strategy for trade, investment, and project development across Africa. Founded in 2003, TWG has long emerged as the partner of choice for Fortune 500 companies interested in both commercial and human development dividends on the continent.  

After decades of supporting US and global investors to succeed in Africa, Rosa in 2017, led TWG into its first direct investment in Africa.  Supporting the region’s creative economy, in 2017, TWG acquired shares and management control of Dominion TV – a Pan-African 24/7 television, entertainment and multimedia company that broadcast in 48 African countries on DStv, Africa’s largest satellite platform.

Background

Education 
Whitaker was born in Washington, D.C. and holds Master's and bachelor's degrees from American University in Washington, D.C. and studied in the United Kingdom and Italy as well at the Foreign Service Institute.

Thought Leadership 
Whitaker appears frequently on the public speaking circuit and has lectured at the Massachusetts Institute of Technology and the National Defense University. She is a guest columnist for AllAfrica.com, and has had opinion pieces published in a variety of publications including the Wall Street Journal, The Hill, Inside U.S. Trade, The Africa Report and U.S. News & World Report. She is an expert on business, trade and investment in Africa in a variety of venues and has been a guest on broadcasts on ABC News, CNN, the BBC and Bloomberg.

Board memberships
She currently serves as a director on the US Chamber of Commerce’s Board. Until March 2021, she served as President of Mercy Ships International, a global faith-based charity operating the world's largest private hospital ship providing medical care to the poorest of the poor in Africa. For more than a decade she served as a member of the Executive Board of Directors of Mercy Ships.

Awards 
 Whitaker is a recipient of numerous awards and honors, including the 2021 Women in International Trade’s Business Legacy Award and Foreign Policy magazine’s Top 100 Global Thinkers in 2010. Other awards and honors include: 
 GUBA 2019 “Excellence in Africa Advancement” Award 
 The Africa Report Magazine’s “20 Most Influential Africa Lobbyists” in 2014
 Face2Face Africa Africa Trailblazer Award (2016)
 "Rosa Whitaker Day" proclaimed by Rep. Charles Rangel, July 9, 2016
 Africa Economic Builders Award (2014)

References

Living people
American businesspeople
People from Washington, D.C.
Year of birth missing (living people)